The 1998 U.S. Men's Clay Court Championships was an Association of Tennis Professionals men's tennis tournament held in Orlando, Florida in the United States and played on outdoor clay courts that was part of the World Series of the 1998 ATP Tour. It was the 30th edition of the tournament and was held from April 20 to April 27, 1998. Third-seeded Jim Courier won the singles title.

Finals

Singles

 Jim Courier defeated  Michael Chang 7–5, 3–6, 7–5
 It was Courier's only title of the year and the 28th of his career.

Doubles

 Grant Stafford /  Kevin Ullyett defeated  Michael Tebbutt /  Mikael Tillström 4–6, 6–4, 7–5
 It was Stafford's 1st title of the year and the 2nd of his career. It was Ullyett's 2nd title of the year and the 3rd of his career.

References

External links 
Association of Tennis Professionals (ATP) – tournament profile